Henri Duvernois (4 March 1875 in Paris - 30 January 1937 in Paris) was a French novelist, playwright and screenwriter.

Filmography 
La Guitare et le Jazz-band, directed by Gaston Roudès (1923, based on the play La Guitare et le Jazz-band)
Après l'amour, directed by Maurice Champreux (1924, based on the play After Love)
, directed by Charles Burguet (1925, based on the novel Faubourg Montmartre)
, directed by Raymond Bernard (1931, based on the novel Faubourg Montmartre)
When Love Is Over, directed by Léonce Perret (1931, based on the play After Love)
, directed by René Guissart (1933, based on the novel La Poule)
Jeanne, directed by Georges Marret, (1934, based on the play Jeanne)
, directed by René Guissart (1935, based on the operetta Les Soeurs Hortensias)
You Are Me, directed by René Guissart (1936, based on the operetta Toi, c'est moi)
After Love, directed by Maurice Tourneur (1948, based on the play After Love)
Maxime, directed by Henri Verneuil (1958, based on the novel Maxime)

Screenwriter
On the Streets, directed by Victor Trivas (1933)
The Scandal, directed by Marcel L'Herbier (1934)

External links 
 

1875 births
1937 deaths
French male screenwriters
20th-century French screenwriters
Burials at Père Lachaise Cemetery
20th-century French male writers
20th-century French dramatists and playwrights